Admiral Dewey Walker (September 5, 1898 – January 7, 2001) was an American Negro league pitcher in the 1920s.

A native of Navarro County, Texas, Walker made his Negro leagues debut in 1923 with the Milwaukee Bears. He went on to play for the Kansas City Monarchs in 1927. Walker died in Chicago, Illinois in 2001 at age 102.

References

External links
 and Seamheads

1898 births
2001 deaths
Kansas City Monarchs players
Milwaukee Bears players
Baseball pitchers
Baseball players from Texas
People from Navarro County, Texas
20th-century African-American people